Inwardleigh is a village and civil parish about 3 and a half miles north north west of Okehampton railway station, in the West Devon district, in the county of Devon, England. The parish contains the village of Folly Gate. The A386 road runs through the parish. In 2011 the parish had a population of 491. The parish touches Hatherleigh, Sampford Courtenay, Okehampton Hamlets, Jacobstowe and Northlew.

Features 
There are 17 listed buildings in Inwardleigh.

History 
Inwardleigh was recorded in the Domesday Book as Lege/Lega. The name means 'Wood/clearing', with the "Inwar" part being a personal name. It was formerly called Ingerley. The parish was historically in the Black Torrington hundred.

References

External links 

Villages in the Borough of West Devon